Dejan Krljanović (born 12 July 1989) is a Slovenian football midfielder.

References

External links
NZS profile 
Nogomania profile 

1989 births
Living people
Sportspeople from Celje
Slovenian footballers
Association football midfielders
NK Celje players
NK IB 1975 Ljubljana players
Enosis Neon Paralimni FC players
Omonia Aradippou players
NK Krka players
NK Aluminij players
Legionovia Legionowo players
Slovenian expatriate footballers
Expatriate footballers in Cyprus
Slovenian expatriate sportspeople in Cyprus
Expatriate footballers in Poland
Slovenian expatriate sportspeople in Poland
Expatriate footballers in Austria
Slovenian expatriate sportspeople in Austria
Slovenian Second League players
Slovenian PrvaLiga players
Cypriot First Division players
Cypriot Second Division players
II liga players
Slovenia youth international footballers
Slovenian football managers